Bob Witz (August 9, 1934 - February 23, 2021) was an American artist, poet and writer. He was born in Tomah, Wisconsin and graduated from the University of Wisconsin in 1959.  He was founder and editor of the literary arts magazine, APPEARANCES.

Some of his correspondences with Artforum magazine were published by editor Robert Pincus-Witten along with his work "The Work Ethic a Drawing" under the title,

References

Artists from Wisconsin
1934 births
People from Tomah, Wisconsin
Living people